is a Japanese professional golfer.

Kobayashi played on the Japan Golf Tour, winning five times.

Professional wins (8)

Japan Golf Tour wins (5)
1977 Bridgestone Tournament
1978 Japan PGA Championship
1981 Naganoken Open
1982 Gunmaken Open
1983 Bridgestone Aso Open

Japan Challenge Tour wins (1)
1991 Korakuen Cup (4th)

Other wins (1)
1976 Kuzuha International

Senior wins (1)
2001 Japan Senior Open

External links

Japanese male golfers
Japan Golf Tour golfers
Sportspeople from Kanagawa Prefecture
1944 births
Living people
20th-century Japanese people